A Long Way from Your Heart is the fifth studio album by American country band Turnpike Troubadours. It was released on October 20, 2017 through Bossier City Records.

Accolades

Track listing

Charts

References

2017 albums
Turnpike Troubadours albums